Ellegarden (stylized as ELLEGARDEN) is a Japanese rock band formed in December 1998 in Chiba, Japan. Ellegarden consists of drummer Hirotaka Takahashi, vocalist/guitarist Takeshi Hosomi, guitarist Shinichi Ubukata, and bassist Yuichi Takada. In 2008, Ellegarden announced an indefinite hiatus, which lasted almost 10 years. In May 2018, Ellegarden announced a reunion with their first national tour since the hiatus.

Background
The English lyrics of the band's songs, which are mostly written by Hosomi, are usually grammatically sound and well pronounced. In the Summer 2006 issue of the American Japanese rock magazine Purple Sky, Hosomi accredited this to the time he spent working as a computer engineer in Oakland, California and later in Japan, where he had English-speaking co-workers.

History
Ellegarden modeled their sound after North American bands such as Blink-182, Sum 41 and Good Charlotte, while also displaying the influence of Hosomi's favorites, Weezer. In the fall of 2001, Ellegarden signed with the Japanese Dynamord label, and released their first EP, Bare Foot, with a full-length album, Don't Trust Anyone But Us, following in the spring of 2002. The album was a hit, and Ellegarden followed with a new LP every year. In 2004, they took part in the Synchronized Rockers tribute album to The Pillows. 2006's Eleven Fire Crackers became the band's first North American release when it was issued by Nettwerk in 2007. Accustomed to playing major shows in Japan, where they've shared stages with the Foo Fighters and Sum 41, Ellegarden made their American live debut in 2006 with a seven-city tour as part of Japan Nite, which included a stop at the South by Southwest Music Conference.

In 2006, Ellegarden performed in numerous Japanese Summer Music Festivals, such as Fuji Rock, Summer Sonic, Nano Mugen Festival and Rising Sun Rock Festival. Their final tour of the year featured the American band Allister, who they became acquainted with during SXSW 2006. In addition, they supported Foo Fighters in their concert at Osaka Castle Hall.

On May 2, 2008, the band announced they would be going on hiatus with a message on their official website:

"Ellegarden has been in the process of creating a new album since last year, however, during the band’s activities, there arose a difference in opinion regarding the motivation for creating a new album. We no longer feel we are able to create an album that we would be satisfied with, and after much discussion we arrived at the conclusion to end the creation of the album and suspend the band’s activities indefinitely. All previously decided shows (including shows not yet announced) up until early September 2008 will still be performed.We want to thank everyone who has supported Ellegarden from the bottom of our hearts. In order to once again create new music as Ellegarden, each of us wants to work on our own personal growth and development. Thank you for everything." – Ellegarden leader, Shinichi Ubukata

Following the recording hiatus announcement, the band has continued to perform live and announced a greatest hits album entitled Ellegarden Best (1999-2008). The album consists of 21 songs and was released on July 2, 2008.  After appearances at several high-profile festivals (including Rock in Japan Fest, Sky Jamboree, Nano Mugen Fes, and Treasure 05x: The Greatest Riot Returns), the band performed four one-man shows in early September to give its fans a send-off before the hiatus; two performances at Zepp Osaka followed by two performances at Shinkiba Studio Coast in Tokyo.

In 2018, Ellegarden announced their first tour in 10 years, ending their hiatus. The tour, titled "THE BOYS ARE BACK IN TOWN", kicked off in August 2018 at Shinkiba Studio Coast, the same venue as their send-off concert. In 2020, the group had announced scheduled performances at several music festivals in Japan, but most of them had been cancelled or postponed due to effects of the COVID-19 pandemic.

In September 2022, Ellegarden released the single "Mountain Top". In December 2022, they released their first full-length album in 16 years, The End of Yesterday.

Band members
  – vocalist, rhythm guitarist
 Hosomi is the main songwriter. He writes almost all the lyrics and music.
 He announced in October 2008 that he was active as a solo artist on his official blog, and that he formed The Hiatus.
 – lead guitarist, backing vocals
 Ubukata is the leader of the band.
 He formed a new band, Nothing's Carved in Stone in 2009.
 – bassist, backing vocals
 Takada is part of the band Meaning.
 He is also a member of the band the End, with former BiS member Nakayama "UK" Yukiko.
 – drummer, backing vocals
 Takahashi is the godparent of the band.
 He formed Scars Borough after the group's hiatus.

Equipment
Takeshi Hosomi (vocal & guitar)
Gibson Les Paul Std./ Gibson Historic Collection 1956 Les Paul Gold Top
Diezel Herbert/ Marshall JCM-800
Shinichi Ubukata (guitar & chorus)
Gibson ES-355 (with no Varitone control)/Gibson Shinichi Ubukata ES-355.
VHT. Pittbull Hundred CLX/ Marshall JMP 2203
Yuichi Takada (bass & chorus)
Fender Precision Bass/ Ampeg SVT-810 E
Hirotaka Takahashi (drums & chorus)
Ludwig Classic Maple Drum Set/ SD Gretsch G4160
Paiste 2002 Series/ Stick Pearl Standard Hickory 190 STH

Discography

Studio albums

Compilation albums

EPs

Singles

Videos

Other appearances

Tours
Dates shown are announcement dates

First tour (August 2002) – 20 stop tour through Japan
My Own Destruction Tour (October 16, 2002) –  30 stops in Japan to promote album of same name
Bring Your Board!! Tour (July 10, 2003) – 25 stops in Japan with one extra live performance
Jitterbug Live Tour (November 12, 2003)
Pepperoni Quattro Tour (June 12, 2004) – toured 19 cities in Japan
Bad for Education Tour 2004 (November 2, 2004) – 15 cities
Riot on the Grill Tour (May 5, 2005) – 39 stops
Space Sonic Tour 2005–2006 (December 3, 2005) – 36 stops
Japan Nite Tour 2006 (January 16, 2006) – first US tour with appearance at SXSW followed by 7 cities
Ellegarden Tour 2006–2007 (October 12, 2006) – 54 stops, first half featuring Allister
Supporting Act for Foo Fighters (December 5, 2006) – Osaka Castle Hall
Ellegarden Tour 2007 (June 10, 2007) – 31 stops in Japan
First Korean Show at Melon AX (October 7, 2007)
THE BOYS ARE BACK IN TOWN TOUR 2018 (May 10, 2018) – 3 stops in Japan to promote return, guest act ONE OK ROCK
NANA-IRO ELECTRIC TOUR 2019 – 3 stop reunion tour with fellow bands Asian Kung-Fu Generation and Straightener

References

External links
Official website 
Morning Scene interview with Ellegarden

Japanese pop punk groups
Japanese alternative rock groups
Musical groups established in 1998
Musical quartets
Musical groups from Chiba Prefecture
English-language musical groups from Japan
EMI Records artists
Universal Music Japan artists